Beau Coup is an American rock band from Cleveland, Ohio.

History
Beau Coup began in the year of 1983 as a recording project and performed under the name Pop Opera. They changed their name to Beau Coup at the end of 1984. The project was started by vocalist Tommy Amato (not to be confused with the prolific session drummer of the same name, also from Cleveland), guitarist Mike McGill and drummer Eric Singer. Eventually, Amato invited keyboardist and songwriter Dennis Lewin to join the project while he was playing in a band called Jonah Koslen and the Heroes.

In that same year after the Heroes disbanded, Lewin, Tommy's older brother Frank and Bill March joined the project. With the help from Henry LoConti Sr. and Henry LoConti Jr., proprietors of the Agora Theatre and Ballroom and the "Agora Record Label", the band released their 6 song EP titled Beau Coup, known as their (White Album) which featured mostly Lewin's songs. The first single released from that EP was "Still In My Heart" which was authorized for airplay by 98.5 WGCL's WNCX  General Manager and Program Directors. The song became a top 10 record on the station. Subsequently Rock 'n Roll Records, a subsidiary of Scotti Brothers Records signed the band and the song was distributed by CBS Records in the year of 1984. Program Director John Gorman (radio) at WMMS also took great interest in Beau Coup and gave them extensive airplay and invited them to participate in many station events as well.

After much struggle with Scotti Brothers Records and after being released by the label, the Beau Coup "Born & Raised on Rock & Roll" album, CD, and cassette were finally released on the Amherst Record label in the USA and on A&M Records of Canada and Europe in 1987.

The song “Sweet Rachel” written by Dennis Lewin, reached #80 on the “Billboard Hot 100” singles chart and received much radio and video play internationally. Other Lewin songs including “Still in my Heart”, “Somewhere Out in the Night” and “Born & Raised on Rock & Roll”  were all picked by Billboard as “Hot Picks”  along with a video which was played on video shows in the US and abroad, including MTV and USA Video Hits.

Although Beau Coup disbanded in the early 1990s, from time to time they reunite to perform for several special events.

Because of the Beau Coup song "Jane" which Lewin wrote about the legendary rock music critic Jane Scott, they were invited to perform at her memorial service which was held at the Rock & Roll Hall of Fame in Cleveland, Ohio in 2011.

Constant members
Tommy Amato ~ Lead Vocals / Background Vocals
Frank Amato ~ Lead Vocals / Background Vocals
Dennis Lewin ~ Keyboards / Background Vocals / Percussion
Bill March ~ Bass Guitar / Background Vocals
Donald Krueger ~ Drums

Notable members
Tim Pierce – (1984) – Guitar
Eric Singer – Drummer
Mike McGill ~ Guitars
John Franks ~ Drums
Jimmy Clark ~ Drums
Billy Sullivan ~ Guitar / Background Vocals
Danny Powers ~ Guitar
Paul Sidoti – Guitar / Background Vocals
Paul Wolf Christensen ~ Sax / Keyboards / Background Vocals
Debi Lewin ~ Background Vocals
Jennifer Lee ~ Background Vocals
Rodney Psyka ~ Percussion and Background Vocals
Michael P. Tyler ~ Backing Keyboards and Background Vocals

Single releases
 "Still In My Heart" Agora Records – AG 82734-1 (1984) out of print
 "Still In My Heart" Rock 'n' Roll Records/Scotti Brothers, Entertainment/CBS, Inc. – ZS4 04632-3 (1984) out of print
 "Somewhere Out In The Night" Rock 'n' Roll Records/Scotti Brothers, Entertainment/CBS, Inc. – ZS4 04768-3 (1985) out of print

EP (Extended Play) releases
"Beau Coup" (White Album) Agora Records – NR 15514 (1984) out of print.
All music and lyrics composed by Dennis Lewin except for "Desperation Blvd" written by Frank Amato, Mike McGill, Bruce and Cliff Norton

Final album
"Born & Raised On Rock & Roll" Amherst Records – AMH 93316 (1987)
All music and lyrics composed by Dennis Lewin except for "Never Stop" written by Tommy Amato, Mike McGill, and Dennis Lewin.
"The Hold On Me" written by Frank Amato and Mike McGill

Album's Track List
"Beau Coup" White Album

Side One:
 Still In My Heart
 You Made Me Believe (In Miracles)
 Someday We'll Be Together
Side Two:
 Don't You Believe It
 Desperation Blvd
 Somewhere Out In The Night

Born & Raised On Rock & Roll

Side One:
 Born & Raised On Rock & Roll
 Somewhere Out In The Night
 Find The Way
 Jane
Side Two:
 Sweet Rachel
 Uptown L.A.
 Still In My Heart
 Never Stop
 Hold On Me

References

External links

Musical groups established in 1983
Rock music groups from Ohio
Musical groups from Cleveland
Scotti Brothers Records artists